Yancy Benjamen Lindsey (born 1962) is a United States Navy vice admiral who currently serves as Commander, Navy Installations Command. Previously, he was the Commander of the Navy Region Europe, Africa, Central. Lindsey received a Bachelor of Science degree in mechanical engineering from the University of California, Berkeley in 1986 and later earned a Master of Military Science degree from Marine Corps University and a Master of Science degree in global leadership from the University of San Diego.

References

1962 births
Living people
Place of birth missing (living people)
University of California, Berkeley alumni
United States Naval Aviators
Marine Corps University alumni
University of San Diego alumni
United States Navy admirals